This is a partial list of 21st-century women artists, sorted alphabetically by decade of birth. These artists are known for creating artworks that are primarily visual in nature, in traditional media such as painting, sculpture, photography, printmaking, ceramics as well as in more recently developed genres, such as installation art, performance art, conceptual art, digital art and video art. Do not add entries for those without a Wikipedia article.

The list starts with artists born in 1970 and later. For earlier births see List of 20th-century women artists.

1970-1979

A

 Liliana Angulo Cortés, b. 1974, Colombian, sculptor
 Jumana Emil Abboud, b. 1971, Palestinian, multidisciplinary artist
 Lida Abdul, b. 1973, Afghan, video artist
 Michele Abeles, b. 1977, American, photographer
 Dhruvi Acharya, b. 1971, Indian, painter
 Lynsey Addario, b. 1973, American, photojournalist
 Golnar Adili , b. 1976, American (b. Iran), multidisciplinary artist
 Deborah Adler, b. 1975, American, designer
 Laurence Aëgerter, b. 1972, French, video artist
 Mequitta Ahuja, b. 1976, American, painter
 Manal AlDowayan, b. 1973, Saudi, installation artist
 Shirin Aliabadi, (1973–2018), Iranian, multi-disciplinary artist
 Emily Allchurch, b. 1974, British, photographer
 Doa Aly, b. 1976, Egyptian, multimedia artist
 Miya Ando, b. 1978, American, multimedia visual artist
 Nazgol Ansarinia, b. 1979, Iranian, sculptor
 Chiho Aoshima, b. 1974, Japanese, multi-disciplinary artist
 Julieta Aranda, b. 1975, Mexican, conceptual artist
 Einat Arif-Galanti, b. 1975, Israeli, photographer
 Natalie Ascencios, b. 1971, American, painter and illustrator
 Keri Ataumbi, b. 1971, American, jewelry maker
 Amalie Atkins, b. 1975, Canadian, video artist
 Shereen Audi , b. 1970, Jordanian, multidisciplinary artist
 damali ayo, b. 1972, American, conceptual artist, performance artist, and author

B

 Carrie Ann Baade, b. 1974, American, painter
 Nina Lola Bachhuber, b. 1971, German, installation artist
 Jessica Backhaus, b. 1970, German, photographer
 Fia Backström, b. 1970, Swedish, installation artist
 Nairy Baghramian, b. 1971, Iranian, sculptor
 Kristin Baker, b. 1975, American, painter
 Hayley Barker, b. 1973, American, painter
 Yto Barrada, b. 1971, French, multimedia artist
 Yael Bartana, b. 1970, Israeli, installation artist
 Del Kathryn Barton, b. 1972, Australian, painter
 Catalina Bauer, b. 1976, Chilean, installation artist
 Marie-Hélène Beaulieu, b. 1979, Canadian, glass artist
 Gina Beavers, b. 1974, American, painter
 Claire Beckett, b. 1978, American, photographer
 Vivian Beer, b. 1977, American, furniture designer
 Beili Liu, b. 1974, Chinese, installation artist
 Katerina Belkina, b. 1974, Russian, photographer
 Vaughn Bell, b. 1978, American, environmental artist
 Elisabeth Belliveau, b. 1979, Canadian, interdisciplinary artist
 Tamy Ben-Tor, b. 1975, Israeli, photographer
 Catherine Bertola, b. 1976, British, installation artist
 Amy Bessone, b. 1970, American, painter
 Melanie Bilenker, b. 1978, American, jewelry maker
 Bingyi, b. 1975, Chinese, painter
 Rossella Biscotti, b. 1978, Italian, installation artist
 Karla Black, b. 1972, Scottish, sculptor
 Tatiana Blass, b. 1979, Brazilian, multimedia artist
 Tia Blassingame, b. 1971, American, book artist
 Katinka Bock, b. 1976, German, sculptor
 Shannon Bool, b. 1972, Canadian, interdisciplinary artist
 Diane Borsato, b. 1973, Canadian, interdisciplinary artist
 Sarah Bostwick, b. 1979, American, multidisciplinary artist
 Carol Bove, b. 1971, American, sculpture
 Shary Boyle, b. 1972, Canadian, interdisciplinary artist
 Kerstin Brätsch, b. 1979, German, painter
 Candice Breitz, b. 1972, South African, photographer
 Sarina Brewer, b. 1970, American, Taxidermy Sculpture
 Sandra Brewster, b. 1973, Canadian, interdisciplinary artist
 Stephanie Brooks, b. 1970, American, conceptual artist
 Amanda Browder , b. 1976, American, installation artist
 Melissa Brown (artist), b. 1974, American, painter
 Bu Hua, b. 1973, Chinese, digital artist
 Karin Bubaš, b. 1976, Canadian, photographer
 Victoria Burge, b. 1976, American, printmaker
 Bogna Burska, b. 1974, Polish, installation artist
 Bisa Butler, b. 1973, American, fiber artist
 Andrea Büttner, b. 1972, German, multimedia artist

C

 Nancy Cadogan, b. 1979, British, painter
 Nancy Baker Cahill, b. 1970, American, multidisciplinary artist
 Marie Caillou, b. 1971, French, graphic artist
 Sarah Cain, b. 1979, American, painter
 Andrea Carlson, b. 1979, American, mixed-media visual artist
 Gillian Carnegie, b. 1971, British, painter
 Nicoletta Ceccoli, b. 1973, Italian, illustrator
 Banu Cennetoğlu, b. 1970, Turkish, installation artist
 Rebecca Chamberlain, b. 1970, American, visual artist
 Hsia-Fei Chang, b. 1973, Taiwanese, installation artist
 Alice Channer, b. 1977, British, sculptor
 Zoë Charlton, b. 1973, American, painter, educator
 Nicole Chesney, b. 1971, American, glass artist
 Swarna Chitrakar, b. 1974, Indian, painter
 Liyen Chong, b. 1979, New Zealander, textile artist
 Julia Rosa Clark, b. 1975, South African, installation artist
 Michal Cole, b. 1974, Israeli, multi-disciplinary artist
 Elizabeth Colomba, b. 1976, French, painter
 Kelli Connell, b. 1974, American, photographer
 Anna Conway, b. 1973, American, photographer
 Cristina Córdova b. 1976, American, sculptor
 Leela Corman, b. 1972, American, illustrator, cartoonist
 Anne-Lise Coste, b. 1973, French, painter
 Shealah Craighead, b. 1976, American, photographer
 Anna Craycroft, b. 1975, American, conceptual artist
 Zoe Crosher, b. 1975, American, photographer
 Sarah Crowner, b. 1974, American, painter
 Jennifer Crupi, b. 1973, American, jeweler
 Lilibeth Cuenca Rasmussen, b. 1970, Danish, performance artist
 Amy Cutler, b. 1974, American, painter, printmaker

D

 Mira Dancy, b. 1979, American, painter
 Nathalie Daoust, b. 1977, Canadian, photographer
 Marisa Darasavath, b. 1972, Laotian, painter
 Angélica Dass, b. 1979, Brazilian, photographer
 Kate Daudy, b. 1970, British, sculptor
 Manon De Pauw, b. 1971, Canadian, installation artist
 Jennifer Des, b. 1975, Belgian, photographer
 Stephanie Deshpande, b. 1975, American, painter
 Rosana Castrillo Diaz, b. 1971, Spanish, sculptor
 Amie Dicke, b. 1978, Dutch, painter
 Erika Diettes, b. 1978, Colombian, photographer
 Trisha Donnelly, b. 1974, American, conceptual artist
 Arabella Dorman, b. 1975, British, painter
 Annabel Dover, b. 1975, British, painter
 Maura Doyle, b. 1973, Canadian, sculptor
 Charlotte Dumas, b. 1977, Dutch, photographer
 Celeste Dupuy-Spencer, b. 1979, American, painter

E

 Mary Early, b. 1975, American, sculptor
 Beka Economopoulos, b. 1974, American, artist, activist
 Daniela Edburg, b. 1975, Mexican, photographer
 Rena Effendi, b. 1977, Azerbaijani, photographer
 Aleana Egan, b. 1979, Irish, sculptor
 Echo Eggebrecht, b. 1977, American, painter
 Amy Elkins, b. 1979, American, photographer
 Hala Elkoussy, b. 1974, Egyptian, installation artist
 Carson Ellis, b. 1975, American, illustrator
 Wanda Ewing, (1970–2013), American, collage, printmaking, latch hook
 Éliane Excoffier, b. 1971, Canadian, photographer

F

 Cherine Fahd, b. 1974, Australian, photographer
 Faith47, b. 1979, South African, muralist
 Rachel Farmer, b. 1972, American, ceramic sculpture, installations
 Golnaz Fathi, b. 1972, Iranian, painter
 Lara Favaretto , b. 1973, Italian, installation artist and sculptor
 Delphine Fawundu, b. 1971, American, photographer
 Nicole Phungrasamee Fein, b. 1974, American, painter
 Rachel Feinstein (artist), b. 1971, American, sculptor
 Dee Ferris, b. 1973, British, painter
 Janet Fieldhouse, b. 1971, Australian, ceramic artist
 Emily Flake, b. 1977, American, illustrator, cartoonist
 Jess Flood-Paddock, b. 1977, British, sculptor
 Susan Folwell, b. 1970, American, ceramicist
 Laura Oldfield Ford, b. 1973, British, painter
 Rachel Foullon, b. 1978, American, sculptor
 Dana Frankfort, b. 1971, American, painter
 Julie Freeman, b. 1972, British, digital artist
 Gabríela Friðriksdóttir, b. 1971, Icelandic, painter

G

 Ellie Ga, b. 1976, American, video, installation, sculpture and performance
 Susie Ganch  b. 1971, American, sculptor, jeweler
 Chitra Ganesh, b. 1975, American, visual artist
 Camille Rose Garcia, b. 1970, American, painter
 Iliana emilia García, b. 1970, Dominican, sculptor
 Amy Gartrell, b. 1974, American, painter
 Lalya Gaye, b. 1978, Swiss, digital artist
 Leyla Gediz, b. 1974, Turkish, painter
 Margi Geerlinks, b. 1970, Dutch, photographer
 Vanessa German, b. 1976, American, sculptor
 Zhenya Gershman, b. 1975, American, painter
 Samara Golden, b. 1973, American, installation artist
 Gabriela Golder, b. 1971, Argentine, installation artist
 Frances Goodman, b. 1975, South African, mixed media artist
 Star Gossage, b. 1973, New Zealander, painter
 Charlotte Graham, b. 1972, New Zealander, painter
 Amy Granat, b. 1976, American, film maker
 Nicola Green, b. 1972, British, painter
 Rona Green (artist), b. 1972, Australian, multidisciplinary artist
 Jillian Green, b. 1975, Australian, painter
 Isca Greenfield-Sanders, b. 1978, American, painter
 Dara Greenwald, (1971–2012), American, interdisciplinary art
 Clare Grill, b. 1979, American, painter
 Liza Grobler, b. 1974, South African, installation artist
 Kate Groobey, b. 1979, British, painter
 Debbie Grossman, b. 1977, American, photographer
 Eva Grubinger , b. 1970, Austrian, installation artist
 Eva Grubinger , b. 1970, Austrian, installation artist
 Małgorzata Dawidek Gryglicka, b. 1976, Polish, installation artist
 Sabrina Gschwandtner, b. 1977, American, film and textile artist
 Shilpa Gupta, b. 1976, Indian, multimedia artist
 Nilbar Güreş, b. 1977, Turkish, multimedia artist

H

 Elpida Hadzi-Vasileva, b. 1971, Macedonian, sculptor
 Roxana Halls, b. 1974, British, painter
 Anthea Hamilton, b. 1978, British, sculptor and performance artist
 Hollis Hammonds , b. 1971, American, installation artist
 Hilary Harkness, b. 1971, American, painter
 Jenny Hart, b. 1972, American, embroidery
 Emma Hart (artist), b. 1974, British, performance artist
 Andrea Hasler, b. 1975, Swiss, sculptor
 Kendra Haste, b. 1971, British, sculptor
 Julia Hasting, b. 1970, German, graphic designer
 Sharon Hayes (artist), b. 1970, American, multimedia artist
 Anne Duk Hee Jordan, b. 1978, German, sculptor
 Michal Helfman, b. 1973, Israeli, multi-disciplinary artist
 Mercedes Helnwein, b. 1979, Austrian, multimedia artist
 Camille Henrot, b. 1978, French, video artist
 Sooreh Hera, b. 1973, Iranian, photographer
 Leslie Hewitt, b. 1977, American, visual artist
 Hiromix  , b. 1976, Japanese, photographer
 Wuon-Gean Ho, b. 1973, British, printmaker
 Sarah Hobbs, b. 1970, American, photographer
 Naomi Hobson, b. 1979, Australian, painter, photographer
 Jungil Hong, b. 1976, American, printmaker
 Risa Horowitz, b. 1970, Canadian, multidisciplinary artist
 Sheree Hovsepian, b. 1974, Iranian, photographer
 Sasha Huber, b. 1975, Finnish, multimedia artist
 Letitia Huckaby, b. 1972, American, photographer
 Katie Hudnall b. 1979 American, woodworker
 Jessica Jackson Hutchins, b. 1971, American, sculptor

I

 Alice Instone, b. 1975, British, painter

J

 Claerwen James, b. 1970, British, painter
 Renata Jaworska, b. 1979, Polish, painter
 Mercedes Jelinek b. 1985, American, photographer
 Natasha Johns-Messenger, b. 1970, Australian, installation artist
 Jess Johnson, b. 1979, New Zealander, installation artist

K

 Nadia Kaabi-Linke, b. 1978, Tunisian, sculptor
 Reena Saini Kallat, b. 1973, Indian, installation artist
 Priya Kambli, b. 1975, Indian, photographer
 Kika Karadi, b. 1975, Hungarian-American, painter
 Amal Kenawy, (1974–2012), Egyptian, performance artist
 Vivian Keulards, b. 1970, Dutch, photographer
 Anita Khemka, b. 1972, Indian, photographer
 Nadia Khiari, b. 1973, Tunisian, illustrator
 Yuki Kihara, b. 1975, New Zealander, multi-disciplinary artist
 Te Rongo Kirkwood, b. 1973, New Zealander, glass artist
 Kapwani Kiwanga, b. 1978, Canadian, multimedia artist
 Rachel Kneebone , b. 1973, British, sculptor
 Lara Knutson, b. 1974, American, industrial designer
 Katrin Koenning, b. 1978, Australian, photographer
 Serena Korda, b. 1979, British, sculptor and performance artist
 Katrin Korfmann, b. 1971, German, photographer
 Annette Krauss, b. 1971, Dutch, performance artist
 Ella Kruglyanskaya, b. 1978, Latvian, painter
 Maya Kulenovic, b. 1975, Canadian, painter
 Alena Kupčíková, b. 1976, Czech, drawer
 Agnieszka Kurant, b. 1978, Polish, conceptual artist
 Anna Kurtycz, (1970–2019), Mexican, graphic artist
 Miriam Syowia Kyambi, b. 1979, Kenyan, installation artist

L

 Jessica Lagunas, b. 1971, Nicaraguan, fiber artist
 Au Hoi Lam, b. 1978, Chinese, painter
 Aylin Langreuter, b. 1976, German, conceptual artist
 Frida Larios, b. 1974, Costa Rican, typo-graphic artist
 Annika Larsson, b. 1972, Swedish, video artist
 Ruth Laskey, b. 1975, American, textile artist, painter
 Michelle LaVallee, b. 1977, Canadian, painter
 Deana Lawson, b. 1979, American, educator, photographer
 Nikki S. Lee, b. 1970, American, visual artist
 Helen Lee (artist), b. 1978, American, glass artist
 Glenda León, b. 1976, Cuban, installation artist
 Jennifer Levonian, b. 1977, American, animator
 Jen Lewin, b. 1974, American, interactive artist
 Olia Lialina, b. 1971, Russian, internet artist
 Klara Lidén, b. 1979, Swedish, installation artist
 Anya Liftig , b. 1977, American, performance artist
 Stephanie Liner, b. 1978, American, sculptor
 Tanya Lukin Linklater, b. 1976, Alutiiq (American), performance artist
 Beth Lipman, b. 1971, American, glass artist
 Katja Loher, b. 1979, Swiss, installation artist
 Victoria Lomasko, b. 1978, Russian, graphic artist
 Sarah Longley, b. 1975, Irish, painter
 Juliette Losq, b. 1978, British, painter
 Camilla Løw, b. 1976, Norwegian, sculptor
 Fiona Lowry, b. 1974, Australian, painter
 Valerie Lynch Napaltjarri, b. 1970, Australian, painter and printmaker

M

 Anissa Mack, b. 1970, American, multimedia artist
 Man Yu, b. 1978, Costa Rican, painter
 Elena Manferdini, b. 1974, American, architect
 Jeannine Marchand  b. 1976, American, ceramicist
 Alisa Margolis, b. 1975, Ukrainian, painter
 MariNaomi, b. 1973, American, graphic artist
 Delita Martin, b. 1972, American, multimedia artist
 Sharon Massey b. 1977, American, jewellery designer
 Christy Matson, b. 1979, American, textile artist
 Carey Maxon, b. 1978, American, painter
 Ursula Mayer, b. 1970, Austrian, multimedia artist
 Sanaz Mazinani, b. 1978, Iranian, installation artist
 Sanaz Mazinani, b. 1978, Canadian, multidisciplinary artist
 Cat Mazza, b. 1977, American, textile artist
 Kerry McAleer-Keeler, b. 1971, printmaker, book artist
 J. J. McCracken, b. 1972, American, multimedia artist
 Eline McGeorge, b. 1970, Norwegian, multi-disciplinary artist
 Sarah McKenzie (artist), b. 1971, American, painter
 Lucy McKenzie, b. 1977, British, painter
 Lucy McLauchlan, b. 1977, British, painter
 Lucy McRae, b. 1979, Australian, body architect
 Julie Mehretu , b. 1970, American, painter
 America Meredith, b. 1972, American, painter, curator, editor
 Natacha Merritt, b. 1977, American, photographer
 Maggie Michael, b. 1974, American, painter
 Tricia Middleton, b. 1972, Canadian, installation artist
 Lê Hiền Minh, b. 1979, Vietnamese, installation artist
 Helen Mirra, b. 1970, American, conceptual artist
 Aiko Miyanaga, b. 1974, Japanese, sculptor

 Jennifer Moon, b. 1973, American, conceptual artist
 Ayanah Moor, b. 1973, American, conceptual artist
 Nyeema Morgan, b. 1977, American, conceptual artist
 Junko Mori, b. 1974, Japanese, metalworker
 Ulrike Müller (artist), b. 1971, Austrian, painter
 Rerrkirrwanga Mununggurr, b. 1971, Australian, painter
 Wangechi Mutu, b. 1972, Kenyan-American, collage painter

N

 Sagit Zluf Namir, b. 1978, Israeli, photographer
 Rosella Namok, b. 1979, Australian, painter
 Shervone Neckles, b. 1979, American, interdisciplinary artist
 Elizabeth Neel, b. 1975, American, painter
 Katrīna Neiburga, b. 1978, Latvian, video artist
 Dorota Nieznalska, b. 1973, Polish, sculptor
 Rika Noguchi, b. 1971, Japanese, photographer

O

 Kuzana Ogg, b. 1971, Indian, painter
 Haji Oh, b. 1976, Korean, textile artist
 Nnenna Okore, b. 1975, Australian, fiber artist
 Okwui Okpokwasili, b. 1972, American, artist, performer, choreographer
 Senam Okudzeto, b. 1972, American, installation artist
 Olek (artist), b. 1978, Polish, sculptor, textile artist
 Camila Oliveira Fairclough, b. 1979, Brazilian, painter
 Paulina Olowska, b. 1976, Polish, multi-disciplinary artist
 Robyn O'Neil, b. 1977, American, drawer
 Gina Osterloh, b. 1973, American, photographer
 Valentina Guidi Ottobri (artist) b. 1988, Italian, artist, curator
 Adrienne Outlaw, b. 1970, American, sculptor
 Virginia Overton, b. 1971, American, sculptor
 Laura Owens, b. 1970, American, painter
 Gloria Oyarzabal, b. 1971, Spanish, photographer

P

 Anna Parkina, b. 1979, Russian, multi-disciplinary artist
 Roula Partheniou, b. 1977, Canadian, sculptor
 Amruta Patil, b. 1979, Indian, illustrator
 Jenny Perlin, b. 1970, American, multimedia artist
 Mai-Thu Perret, b. 1976, Swiss, performance artist
 Eileen Perrier, b. 1974, British, photographer
 Vinca Petersen, b. 1973, British, photographer
 Ciara Phillips, b. 1976, Canadian, installation artist
 Amalia Pica, b. 1978, Argentine, multidisciplinary artist
 Sarah Pickering, b. 1972, British, photographer
 Outi Pieski, b. 1973, Finnish, installation artist
 Grytė Pintukaitė, b. 1977, Lithuanian, painter
 Amy Pleasant, b. 1972, American, painter
 Lucy Pullen, b. 1971, Canadian, installation artist
 Melanie Pullen, b. 1975, American, photographer

Q

 Tazeen Qayyum, b. 1973, Pakistani-Canadian, conceptual artist
 Eileen Quinlan, b. 1972, American, photographer

R

 Sara Greenberger Rafferty, b. 1978, American, multimedia artist
 Sara Rahbar, b. 1976, Iranian, installation artist
 Nelda Ramos, b. 1977, Argentine, multidisciplinary artist
 Jessica Rankin, b. 1971, American, embroidery
 Barbara Rapp, b. 1972, Austrian, multimedia artist
 Lucy Raven, b. 1977, American, multidisciplinary artist
 Mary Reid Kelley, b. 1979, American, multimedia artist
 Sheilah Wilson ReStack, b. 1975, Canadian, video artist
 Dominique Rey (artist), b. 1976, Canadian, photographer
 Abigail Reynolds (artist), b. 1975, British, collage artist
 Hannah Rickards, b. 1979, British, installation artist
 Amber Robles-Gordon, b. 1977, American, mixed media visual artist
 Favianna Rodriguez, b. 1978, American, interdisciplinary artist
 Rocio Romero, b. 1971, Chilean-American, designer
 Tracey Rose, b. 1974, South African, performance artist
 Pamela Rosenkranz, b. 1979, Swiss, multimedia artist
 Amanda Ross-Ho , b. 1975, American, interdisciplinary artist
 Laurel Roth Hope, b. 1973, American, artist and naturalist
 Mika Rottenberg, b. 1976, Argentine, video artist
 Abbey Ryan, b. 1979, American, painter

S

 Jenny Sabin, b. 1974, American, architect
 Ruth Sacks, b. 1977, South African, book artist
 Diana Salazar, b. 1972, Mexican, ceramicist
 Shizu Saldamando, b. 1978, American, painter
 Virginia San Fratello b. 1971, American, architect, 3D printer
 Jenny Saville , b. 1970, British, painter
 Yhonnie Scarce, b. 1973, Australian, glass artist
 Keisha Scarville, b. 1975, American, photographer
 Allison Schulnik, b. 1978, American, painter
 Martina Schumacher, b. 1972, German, painter
 Dana Schutz, b. 1976, American, painter
 Kateřina Šedá, b. 1977, Czech, conceptual artist
 Susan Seubert, b. 1970, American, photographer
 Anna Sew Hoy, b. 1976, New Zealander, sculptor
 Shirana Shahbazi, b. 1974, Iranian, photographer
 Sara Shamma, b. 1975, Syrian, painter
 Tai Shani, b. 1976, British, performance artist
 Amy Sherald, b. 1973, American, painter
 Ranjani Shettar, b. 1977, Indian, sculptor
 Sienna Shields, b. 1976, American, abstract artist
 Jean Shin, b. 1971, American, sculptor
 Jeena Shin, b. 1973, New Zealander, painter
 Heji Shin, b. 1976, German, photographer
 Erin Shirreff, b. 1975, Canadian, sculptor
 Yvonne Shortt, b. 1972, American, installation artist
 Leslie Shows, b. 1977, American, painter
 Anna Shteynshleyger, b. 1977, Russian, photographer
 Amie Siegel, b. 1974, American, video, photography and installation artist
 Sigga Björg Sigurðardóttir, b. 1977, Icelandic, painter, animator
 Xaviera Simmons, b. 1974, American, multimedia artist
 Taryn Simon , b. 1975, American, conceptual artist
 Jana Šindelová, b. 1970, Czech, printmaker
 Brooke Singer, b. 1972, American, media artist
 Lucy Skaer, b. 1975, Scottish, sculptor
 Sonya Sklaroff, b. 1970, American, painter
 Veronica Smirnoff, b. 1979, British, painter
 Allison Smith (artist), b. 1972, American, sculptor
 Alejandra González Soca, b. 1973, Uruguayan, sculptor
 Rachelle Mozman Solano, b. 1972, American, photographer
 Jen Sorensen, b. 1974, American, cartoonist and illustrator
 Linda Sormin b. 1971, Canadian, ceramics, sculpture
 Monika Sosnowska, b. 1972, Polish, installation artist
 Meredyth Sparks, b. 1972, American, multimedia artist
 Emily Speed, b. 1979, British, installation and performance artist
 Raphaella Spence, b. 1978, British, painter
 Loredana Sperini, b. 1970, Swiss, sculptor
 Molly Springfield, b. 1977, American, drawer
 Hannah Starkey, b. 1971, British, photographer
 Despina Stokou, b. 1978, Greek, painter
 Clare Strand, b. 1973, British, photographer
 Corin Sworn, b. 1976, British, multidisciplinary visual artist
 Stephanie Syjuco, b. 1974, Filipino-American, conceptual artist

T

 Taravat Talepasand, b. 1979, American, painter and sculptor
 Ronika Tandi, b. 1975, Zimbabwean, sculptor
 Latai Taumoepeau, b. 1972, Australian, performance artist
 Alison Elizabeth Taylor, b. 1972, American, woodworker
 Josephine Taylor , b. 1977, American, painter
 Saffronn Te Ratana, b. 1975, New Zealander, painter
 Althea Thauberger, b. 1970, Canadian, photographer
 Mickalene Thomas, b. 1971, American, painter
 Ann Toebbe, b. 1974, American, painter
 Faye Toogood b. 1977, British designer
 Clarissa Tossin, b. 1973, Brazilian, sculptor
 Janaina Tschäpe , b. 1973, German, multimedia artist
 Salla Tykkä, b. 1973, Finnish, video artist

U

 Hema Upadhyay, (1972–2015), Indian, installation artist
 Francis Upritchard, b. 1976, New Zealander, sculptor
 Kaari Upson, (1970–2021), American, mixed media visual artist
 Hana Usui, b. 1974, Japanese, painter
 Camille Utterback, b. 1970, American, installation artist

V

 Joana Vasconcelos, b. 1971, Portuguese, installation artist
 Eva Vermandel, b. 1974, Belgian, photographer
 Charlene Vickers, b. 1970, Canadian, painter
 Fernanda Viégas, b. 1971, Brazilian, information artist
 Marianne Vitale , b. 1973, American, installation artist
 Anna Von Mertens, b. 1973, American, textile artist

W

 Sophia Wallace, b. 1978, American, conceptual artist
 Patricia Watwood, b. 1971, American, painter
 Julie Weitz, b. 1979, American, installation artist
 Kaethe Katrin Wenzel, b. 1972, German, conceptual artist
 Nicole Wermers, b. 1971, German, performance artist
 Megan Whitmarsh, b. 1972, American, textile artist
 Tania Willard, b. 1977, Canadian, multidisciplinary artist
 Paula Wilson, b. 1975, American, mixed media visual artist
 Nicole Wittenberg, b. 1979, American, painter
 Rachel Wolfe-Goldsmith, b. 1991, American, muralist
 Clare Woods, b. 1972, British, installation artist
 Saya Woolfalk, b. 1979, American, multimedia artist
 Janis Mars Wunderlich, b. 1970, American, ceramicist
 Gesche Würfel, b. 1976, German, photographer

Y

 Anusha Yadav, b. 1975, Indian, photographer
 Myriam Yates, b. 1971, Canadian, photographer
 Anicka Yi, b. 1971, Korean, conceptual artist
 Lynette Yiadom-Boakye, b. 1977, British, painter
 Maria Yoon, b. 1971, Korean, performance artist
 Brenna Youngblood, b. 1979, American, mixed media visual artist
 Jinny Yu, b. 1976, Canadian, painter

Z

 Carla Zaccagnini, b. 1973, Brazilian, multidisciplinary artist
 Valeria Zalaquett, b. 1971, Chilean, photographer
 Billie Zangewa, b. 1973, Malawian, fabric artist
 Joanna Zastróżna, b. 1972, Polish, photographer
 Pippi Zornoza, b. 1978, American, interdisciplinary artist
 Molly Zuckerman-Hartung, b. 1975, American, painter

1980-1989

A

 Zarouhie Abdalian, b. 1982, American, installation artist
 Nina Chanel Abney, b. 1982, American, painter
 Laia Abril, b. 1986, Spanish, photographer
 Sarah Al Abdali, b. 1989, Saudi Arabian, street artist
 Amelia Alcock-White, b. 1981, Canadian, painter
 Diana al-Hadid, b. 1981, American, sculptor
 Morehshin Allahyari, b. 1985, Iranian, 3D printing artist
 Lisa Alvarado, b. 1982, American, visual artist and harmonium player
 Heba Amin, b. 1980, Egyptian, multidisciplinary artist
 Natalia Anciso, b. 1985, American, visual art, installation art
 Katrina Andry, b. 1981, American, printmaker
 Jaime Angelopoulos, b. 1982, Canadian, sculptor
 Antigirl, 1984, American, multidisciplinary artist and graphic designer
 Naama Arad, b. 1985, Israeli, sculptor
 Carmen Argote, b. 1981, American, performance art and sculpture
 Beth Diane Armstrong, b. 1985, South African, sculptor
 Morgan Asoyuf, b. 1984, Canadian, jewelry maker
 Dana Awartani, b. 1987, Saudi, mosaic artist
 Manon Awst, b. 1983, Welsh, sculptor

B

 Firelei Báez, b. 1981, American (b. Dominican Republic), visual artist
 Trisha Baga, b. 1985, American, visual art, installation art
 Pénélope Bagieu, b. 1982, French, Illustrator
 Bianca Bagnarelli, b. 1988, Italian, illustrator
 Olga Balema, b. 1984, Ukrainian, sculptor
 Natalie Ball, b. 1980, American, multidisciplinary artist
 Ana Teresa Barboza, b. 1981, Peruvian, textile artist
 Leslie Barlow, b. 1989, American, painter
 Math Bass, b. 1981, American, multidisciplinary artist
 Ayah Bdeir, b. 1982, Canadian, interactive artist
 Endia Beal, b. 1985, American, visual artist, curator
 Alexandra Bell, b. 1983, American, multidisciplinary artist
 Genevieve Belleveau, b. 1984, American, performance artist and singer
 Meriem Bennani, b. 1988, Moroccan, video artist
 Trudy Benson, b. 1985, American, painter
 María Berrío, b. 1982, Colombian, paper artist
 Hannah Black, b. 1981, British, video artist
 Dineo Seshee Bopape, b. 1981, South African, multimedia artist
 Sascha Braunig, b. 1983, Canadian, painter
 Dina Brodsky, b. 1981, American, painter
 LaKela Brown, b. 1982, American, sculptor
 Lex Brown (artist), b. 1989, American, performance artist

C

 Marina Camargo, b. 1980, Brazilian, multimedia artist
 Elaine Cameron-Weir, b. 1985, Canadian, sculptor
 Jacynthe Carrier, b. 1982, Canadian, photographer
 Jordan Casteel, b. 1989, American, painter
 Caitlin Cherry, b. 1987, American, painter, sculptor, educator
 Talia Chetrit, b. 1982, American, photographer
 Genevieve Chua, b. 1984, Singapore, painter
 Liz Climo, b. 1981, American, illustrator, animator
 Bethany Collins, b. 1984, American, book artist
 Stephanie Comilang, b. 1980, Canadian, video artist
 Megan Cope, b. 1982, Australian, multidisciplinary artist
 Yvette Coppersmith, b. 1980, Australian, painter
 Adriana Corral, b. 1983, American, installation, performance, and sculpture
 Petra Cortright, b. 1986, American, video, painting, and digital media
 Lucy Cox (artist), b. 1988, British, painter
 Njideka Akunyili Crosby, b. 1983, Nigerian, painter
 Rosson Crow, b. 1982, American, painter

D

 Dina Danish, b. 1981, Egyptian, conceptual artist
 Gohar Dashti, b. 1980, Iranian, photographer
 Kenturah Davis, b. 1984, American, multimedia artist
 Heather Day, b. 1989, American, painter
 Erika DeFreitas, b. 1980, Canadian, multidisciplinary artist
 Abigail DeVille, b. 1981, American, sculptor
 Heather Dewey-Hagborg, b. 1982, American, information artist
 Francesca DiMattio, b. 1981, American, painter, ceramicist
 Chhan Dina, b. 1984, Cambodian, painter
 Debbie Ding, b. 1984, Singapore, multimedia artist
 Lucy Dodd, b. 1981, American, painter, installation artist
 Eliza Douglas, b. 1984, American, painter
 Amanda Dunbar, b. 1982, American, painter

E

 Alicia Eggert, 1981, American, interdisciplinary artist
 Cécile B. Evans, 1983, Belgian-American, multimedia artist

F

 Modupeola Fadugba, b. 1985, Nigeria, installation artist
 Tatyana Fazlalizadeh, b. 1985, American, painter
 Amy Feldman, b. 1981, American, painter
 Ana Teresa Fernández, b. 1980, Mexican, painter
 Selina Foote, b. 1985, New Zealander, painter
 Nina Mae Fowler, b. 1981, British, photographer
 Natalie Frank, b 1980, American, painter
 Jo Fraser, b. 1986, British, painter
 LaToya Ruby Frazier, b. 1982, American, photographer

G

 Nikita Gale, b. 1983, American, visual artist
 Doreen Garner, b. 1986, American, sculptor
 Opashona Ghosh, b. 1987, Indian, illustrator
 Karine Giboulo, b. 1980, Canadian, sculptor
 Alexandra Daisy Ginsberg, b. 1982, British, digital artist
 Sarah Beth Goncarova, b. 1980, American, sculptor
 Noémie Goudal, b. 1984, French, photographer
 Alonsa Guevara, b. 1986, Chilean-American, painter
 Martine Gutierrez, b. 1989, American, visual and performance artist

H

 Lauren Halsey, b. 1987, American, installation artist
 Josephine Halvorson, b. 1981, American, painter
 Rana Hamadeh, b. 1983, Lebanese, installation artist
 Han Yajuan, b. 1980, Chinese, painter
 Charlotte Harris, b. 1980, British, painter
 Vashti Harrison, b. 1988, American, writer, illustrator and filmmaker
 Libby Heaney, b. 1983, British, technology artist
 Lena Henke, b. 1982, German, sculptor
 Emily Hesse, b. 1980, British, multidisciplinary visual artist
 Shara Hughes, b. 1981, American, painter
 Marguerite Humeau, 1986, French, sculptor

J

 Tomashi Jackson, b. 1980, American, multimedia artist
 Pauline Curnier Jardin, b. 1980, French, video artist
 Steffani Jemison, b. 1981, American, multimedia artist
 Adela Jušić, b. 1982, Bosnian, installation artist

K

 Lauren Kalman, b. 1980, American, visual artist
 Amy Karle, b. 1980, American, sculptor
 Katarzyna Karpowicz, b. 1985, Polish, painter
 Tomoko Kashiki, b. 1982, Japanese, painter
 Mari Katayama, b. 1987, Japanese, multi-disciplinary artist
 Caitlin Keogh, b. 1982, American, painter
 Hayv Kahraman, b. 1982, Iraqi-American, painter
 Christine Sun Kim, b. 1980, American, sound artist
 Anna King (artist), b. 1984, Scottish, painter
 Kacie Kinzer, b. 1982, American, interactive artist
 Vera Klute, b. 1981, German, multi-disciplinary artist
 Nahoko Kojima, b. 1981, Japanese, paper artist
 Olya Kroytor, b. 1986, Russian, performance artist
 Julia Kwon b. 1987, American, fiber artist

L

 Jenni Laiti, b. 1981, Finnish, performance artist
 Carolyn Lazard, 1987, American, multimedia artist
 Alexandra Lethbridge, b. 1987, born in Hong Kong and based in the UK, photographer
 Ann Lewis (artist), b. 1981, American, multidisciplinary activist artist
 Linda Nguyen Lopez b. 1981, American, ceramicist
 Gretta Louw, b. 1981, Australian, multidisciplinary artist

M

 Lauren Mabry b. 1985, American, ceramicist
 Tala Madani, b. 1981, Iranian, painter
 Aida Mahmudova, b. 1982, Azerbaijani, painter
 Ato Malinda, b. 1981, Kenyan, performance artist
 Jen Mann, b. 1987, Canadian, painter
 Helen Marten, b. 1985, British, sculptor and installation artist
 Shantell Martin, b. 1980, British, drawer
 Saba Masoumian, 1982, Iranian, sculptor
 Park McArthur, b. 1984, American, multimedia artist
 Klea McKenna, 1980, American, photographer
 Meryl McMaster, b. 1988, Canadian, photographer
 Alexa Meade, b. 1986, American, painter
 Christien Meindertsma, b. 1980, Dutch, multimedia artist
 Rosa Menkman, b. 1983, Dutch, data artist
 Caroline Mesquita, b. 1989, French, sculptor
 Alice Miceli, b. 1980, Brazilian, photographer
 Nicole Miller (artist), b. 1982, American, installation artist
 Olia Mishchenko, b. 1980, Canadian, drawer
 Nandipha Mntambo, b. 1982, South African, sculptor
 Adeline de Monseignat, b. 1987, Dutch-Monagesque, sculptor
 Polly Morgan (taxidermist), b. 1980, British, taxidermist
 Juno Morrow, b. 1986, American, multidisciplinary artist
 Jill Mulleady, b. 1980, Uruguayan, painter
 Brenna Murphy, b. 1986, American, multimedia artist
 Nontsikelelo Mutiti, b. 1982, Zimbabwean, graphic designer

N

 Alexandra Nechita, b. 1985, Romanian-American, painter
 Polly Nor, b. 1989, British, illustrator
 Katja Novitskova, b. 1984, Estonian, installation artist

O

 Christy Oates, 1980, American, woodworker
 Toyin Ojih Odutola, b. 1985, Nigerian-American, painter
 Temitayo Ogunbiyi, b. 1984, American, sculptor

P

 Kit Paulson  b. 1981, glass artist
 Sara Pichelli, b. 1983, Italian, illustrator
 Hayal Pozanti, b. 1983, Turkish, painter
 Nathlie Provosty, b. 1981, American, painter
 Puppies Puppies, b. 1989, American, performance artist

Q

 Nathalie Quagliotto, b. 1984, Canadian, sculptor
 Christina Quarles, b. 1985, American, painter

R

 Mary Ramsden, b. 1984, British, painter
 Romina Ressia, b. 1981, Argentine, photographer
 Anna Ridler, b. 1985, British, artificial intelligence artist
 Mélanie Rocan, b. 1980, Canadian, painter
 Adele Röder, b. 1980, German, painter
 Sonia Romero, b. 1980, American, muralist and printmaker
 Julia Rommel, b. 1980, American, painter
 Harmonia Rosales, b. 1984, American, painter
 Sheena Rose, b. 1985, Barbadian, multidisciplinary artist
 Rachel Rose (artist), b. 1986, American, visual artist
 Anastasia Ryabova, b. 1985, Russian, installation artist

S

 Analia Saban, b. 1980, Argentine, conceptual artist
 Aki Sasamoto, 1980, Japanese, installation artist
 Erin Schaff, b. 1989, American, photographer
 Hiba Schahbaz, b. 1981, Pakistani-American, painter
 Stacy Jo Scott, b. 1981, American, ceramicist
 Davina Semo, b. 1981, American, sculptor
 Indrė Šerpytytė, b. 1983, Lithuanian, photographer
 Fatma Shanan, b. 1986, Israeli, painter
 Jessica Rosemary Shepherd, b. 1984, British, botanical artist
 Claire Sherman, b. 1981, American, painter
 Janine Shroff, b. 1983, Indian, illustrator
 Mary Sibande, b. 1982, South African, multi-disciplinary artist
 Pola Sieverding, b. 1981, German, photographer
 Aram Han Sifuentes b. 1986  Korean American, fiber artist
 Kseniya Simonova, b. 1985, Ukrainian, sand artist
 Buhlebezwe Siwani, b. 1987, South African, multi-disciplinary artist
 Tuesday Smillie, b. 1981, American, interdisciplinary artist
 Amy Sol, b. 1981, American, painter
 Yulia Spiridonova, b. 1986, Russian, photographer
 Jen Stark, b. 1983, American, multimedia artist
 Hannah Stouffer, b. 1981, American, illustrator
 Maya Stovall, b. 1982, American, conceptual artist
 Elke Reva Sudin, b. 1987, American, painter
 April Surgent b. 1982, American, glass engraver

T

 Claire Tabouret, b. 1981, French, painter
 Jillian Tamaki, b. 1980, Canadian, illustrator
 Gabrielle Laïla Tittley, b. 1988, Canadian, multidisciplinary artist
 Alessandra Torres, b. 1980, American, sculptor
 Ka-Man Tse, b. 1981, American, photographer
 MJ Tyson, b. 1986, American, jewelry designer

V

 Laurence Vallières, b. 1986, Canadian, sculptor
 Sam Vernon, b. 1987, American, installation artist
 Lina Iris Viktor, b. 1987, British, video artist

W

 Addie Wagenknecht, b. 1981, American, interactive artist
 Ericka Walker, b. 1981, American, printmaker
 Stacey Lee Webber, b. 1982, American, metalsmith
 Mia Florentine Weiss, b. 1980, German, performance artist
 Ambera Wellmann, b. 1982, Canadian, painter
 Elsa Werth, b. 1985, French, multidisciplinary artist
 Liz West, b. 1985, British, installation artist
 Carmen Winant, b. 1983, American, multimedia artist
 Anne Wölk, b. 1982, German, painter
 Bethan Laura Wood, b. 1983, British, designer
 Agustina Woodgate, 1981, Argentine, installation artist

Y

 Sarah Yates, b. 1987, British, muralist
 Pinar Yolaçan, 1981, Turkish, garment artist

Z

 Amina Zoubir, b. 1983, Algerian, multidisciplinary artist
 Sarah Zucker, b. 1985, American, multimedia artist

1990-1999

 Akiane, b. 1994, American, painter
 Marina Amaral, b. 1994, Brazilian, photographer
 Asinnajaq, b. 1991, Canadian, video artist
 Olivia Bee, b. 1994, American, photographer
 Aria Dean, b. 1993, American, artist, critic, and curator
 Jadé Fadojutimi, b. 1993, British, painter
 Basmah Felemban, b. 1993, Saudi Arabian graphic designer
 Ilana Harris-Babou, b. 1991, American, sculptor and installation artist
 Kudzanai-Violet Hwami, b. 1993, Zimbabwean, painter
 Acacia Johnson, b. 1990, American, photographer
 Tau Lewis, b. 1993, Canadian, sculptor
 Olivia Locher, b. 1990, American, photographer
 Deena Mohamed, b. 1995, Egyptian, graphic artist
 Sethembile Msezane, b. 1991, South African, multi-disciplinary artist
 Samera Paz, b. 1994, American, photographer
 Maria Qamar, b. 1991, Canadian, painter
 Daisy Quezada Ureña, b. 1990, American, ceramic and fabric artist
 Harriet Riddell, b. 1990, British, textile artist
 Tschabalala Self, b. 1990, American, mixed media visual artist
 Emelina Soares, b. 1993, Indian, installation artist
 Sheida Soleimani, b. 1990, Iranian-American, photographer
 Chanell Stone, b. 1992, American, photographer
 Malina Suliman, b. 1990, Afghan, multidisciplinary artist
 Minna Sundberg, b. 1990, Swedish, illustrator
 Chern'ee Sutton, b. 1996, Australian, painter
 Maggie Thompson (artist), b. 1990, American, textile artist
 Zeinixx, b. 1990, Senegalese, graffiti artist

2000-2009
Autumn de Forest, 2001, American, painter
Alicja Kozłowska, 2000, Polish, textile artist

2010-2019

2020-2029

See also
Women artists
Women in photography
List of women photographers

Lists of artists
Modern artists
Lists of women artists
Women artists